Mallet Quartet is a composition by Steve Reich scored for two marimbas and two vibraphones, or for four marimbas. It was co-commissioned by the Amadinda Quartet in Budapest, on the occasion of its 25th anniversary, by Nexus in Toronto, So Percussion in New York, and Synergy Percussion in Australia. It received its world premiere in December 6, 2009 at the Bela Bartók National Concert Hall in Hungary and its US premiere at Stanford University on January 9, 2010.

Structure
Mallet Quartet is in three movements, with its entirety lasting around 14 minutes:
 Fast
 Slow
 Fast

The second movement, slow, is one of his most thinly textured works with acoustic instrumentation, as admitted by Reich himself.

Performance
The piece can either be played with two marimbas and two vibraphones, or with four marimbas.

References

Compositions by Steve Reich
Chamber music compositions
2009 compositions